Gergő Németh is a Hungarian canoer who has been competing since the late 2000s. He won a bronze medal in the C-4 200 m event at the 2009 ICF Canoe Sprint World Championships in Dartmouth, Nova Scotia.

References
Canoe09.ca profile

Hungarian male canoeists
Living people
Year of birth missing (living people)
ICF Canoe Sprint World Championships medalists in Canadian
21st-century Hungarian people